Isca Hockey Club is a field hockey club that plays in Exeter. The club plays fixtures at several locations, primarily on the water-based pitch at the University of Exeter and Exeter School.

The club has six men's and five women's teams, junior teams at all age groups, and also mixed and veteran's teams. The men's 1st XI play in the England Hockey Men's League Conference West and the women's 1st XI play in the England Hockey Investec Women's Hockey League Division One South

The name of the club, Isca, originates from Isca Dumnoniorum, the Roman name for the Exeter area. The club has secured several major national honours since it was created in 1913, and recently celebrated its 100-year anniversary in 2013.

Major national honours
 1978–79 - Men's National League Champions
 1985-86 - Men's National League Runners Up

External links
 Official website  - www.iscahockey.co.uk

References

English field hockey clubs